"On Top of Old Smoky" (often spelled "Smokey") is a traditional folk song of the United States. As recorded by The Weavers, the song reached the pop music charts in 1951. It is catalogued as Roud Folk Song Index No. 414.

History as folk song 

It is unclear when, where and by whom the song was first sung. In historical times folksongs were the informal property of the communities that sang them, passed down through generations. They were published only when a curious person took the trouble to visit singers and document their songs, an activity that in America began only around the turn of the 20th century. For this reason it is unlikely that an originator of "On Top of Old Smoky" could ever be identified.

One of the earliest versions of "On Top of Old Smoky" to be recorded in fieldwork was written down by the English folklorist Cecil Sharp, who during the First World War made three summer field trips to the Appalachian Mountains seeking folk songs, accompanied and assisted by Maud Karpeles. Sharp and Karpeles found to their delight that the Appalachians, then geographically isolated, were a strong preserve of traditional music and that many of the people they met were naturally gifted singers who knew a great number of songs. They were also intrigued to find that many of the songs the people sang to them were versions of songs Sharp had earlier collected from people in rural England, suggesting that the ancestors of the Appalachian residents had brought them over from the old country.

In one version the first verse is the following;

The version of "On Top of Old Smoky" that Sharp and Karpeles collected was sung to them on 29 July 1916 by Miss Memory Shelton in Alleghany, Madison County, North Carolina. Miss Shelton was part of a family several of whose members sang for Sharp. Memory Shelton's version differs in notes, rhythm, and wording from the version most people know today, but only modestly so; for instance the words of the first verse are as follows:

where sparking is a now-rare word that means courting. She also avoided the extreme prolongation of the syllables of Smoky and lover that are customary today, instead assigning just one musical beat to Smo- and lov- and two to -key and -er. The version Miss Shelton sang has twelve verses. It was published twice; first in the preliminary volume of folk songs prepared by Sharp and Karpeles after their first summer of fieldwork (Sharp and Karpeles 1917), then in 1932 after Sharp's death, in the much larger compendium of  Appalachian folk songs that Karpeles edited from the full notes of their three summers' fieldwork.

American field workers were also active in the Appalachians. A (tuneless) text for "On Top of Old Smoky", similar to what Memory Shelton sang, was published by E. C. Perrow in 1915, slightly before Sharp's fieldwork. In the following decades, still further variants of "On Top of Old Smoky" were recorded by fieldworkers in North Carolina and  Tennessee.

Alternative tunes and words
The Appalachian tradition characteristically spawned multiple variants of the same song. In the extreme case, the same basic set of words could be sung to more than one tune, or the same tune could adopt a completely different set of words. The now-standard tune of "On Top of Old Smoky" competed with a completely different tune, which Sharp and Karpeles encountered when they returned to the Appalachians for further fieldwork in 1917, and versions of this tune were also found by later fieldworkers.

The tune of "On Top of Old Smoky" familiar to most people today was also paired with a completely different set of words in a folk song called "The Little Mohee", about a frontiersman who falls in love with an Indian maiden (or, in some versions, a sailor who falls in love with a South Seas maiden). This tune was collected by the American fieldworkers Loraine Wyman and Howard Brockway in Pine Mountain, Kentucky from a singer named Mary Ann Bagley, and published by them in 1916, hence a year before the Sharp/Karpeles version mentioned above.

Because the versions gathered in fieldwork vary so much, there is no particular version of "On Top of Old Smoky" that can lay claim to being the "authentic" or "original" version. The version that Sharp and Karpeles collected from Memory Shelton can be read online (see Sharp and Karpeles (1917), in References below), and the version by Pete Seeger that greatly popularized the song in modern times (see below) is also online.

Location of "Old Smoky"
Old Smoky is plausibly a high mountain somewhere in the southern Appalachians, since so many versions recorded by fieldworkers were collected there. Possibilities include Clingmans Dome, named "Smoky Dome" by local Scotch-Irish inhabitants, but exactly which mountain it is may be lost to antiquity.

Emergence of the song in popular music 

Cecil Sharp collected Appalachian folksongs just before the time when that music came to be "discovered" by the outside world and sold as a commercial product by the nascent recording industry, a development which would ultimately create the modern genre of country music. The first to make a commercial recording of "On Top of Old Smoky" was George Reneau, "The Blind Musician of the Smoky Mountains", who worked as a busker in Knoxville, Tennessee, just west of the Appalachians. In 1925, Reneau made the trip to New York City to record the song, and others, for Vocalion (Vo 15366). His version of "On Top of Old Smoky" used the alternative tune noted above.

In the 1940s through the mid 1960s, the United States experienced a folk music revival, of which Pete Seeger was a leading figure. His music, some of it drawn from scholarly sources like Sharp, was popular, and was disseminated widely in commercial recordings. Seeger modified a version of "On Top of Old Smoky" that he had learned in the Appalachians, writing new words and banjo music. He said that he thought that "certain verses go back to Elizabethan times."  The sheet music for the song credited Seeger for "new words and music arrangement".

The Weavers, a folk-singing group that Seeger had co-founded, recorded a very popular version of the song, using Seeger's arrangement, on 21 February 1951. It was released by Decca Records as catalog number 27515, reaching No. 2 on the Billboard chart and No. 1 on the Cash Box chart, and selling over a million copies.

The enormous popularity of those recordings (and others following in their wake - see below) led to the curious situation of the song re-attaining folk status. It is one of the few songs that most Americans know from childhood, and many are unaware of the mid-century recordings that promulgated it so widely.

Other versions
A number of artists released their versions following the success of the Weavers' recording. A version by Percy Faith & His Orchestra with Burl Ives on vocals reached No. 10 on the Billboard chart in 1951. It became one of Burl Ives' signature songs. Vaughn Monroe & His Orchestra also had success with the song, reaching No. 8 on the chart in June 1951.

Following its reintroduction to America by the Weavers, the song became a standard item of popular music, sung by Bing Crosby, Perry Como, Gene Autry, as well as (in a brief excerpt) Elvis Presley. 

The country music singer Kenny Rogers sometimes used the first part of "On Top of Old Smoky" as a joke in concert. He played the opening bars of "Lucille", one of his biggest hits, and told the crowd something along the lines of "None of you know what song this is". When the audience replied with "Yes, we do", Rogers then began to sing "On Top of Old Smoky."

A great many versions followed in the ensuing decades. The following list is ordered chronologically.

In 1951, Swedish revue group Flickery Flies with Brita Borg recorded a Swedish version. This was during a time of collaboration with showbiz impresario and songwriter Povel Ramel who in a revue paraphrased it as Högt uppe på berget, jag har till en vän, förlorat en femma, jag lär nog aldrig se den utigen (High up on the mountain, I have to a friend, lost a 5 kronor bill, I doubt I'll see it again).

Dave Van Ronk included the song on his album The Mayor of McDougal Street: Rarities 1957–1969. This version sounds much more Celtic in nature, with more vocal ornamentation and a looser rhythmic structure.

Television host Jack Narz recorded the song for his album Sing the Folk Hits With Jack Narz in 1959.

In The Many Loves of Dobie Gillis episode #3.13 "Blue-Tail Fly" (ca. 1961), Dobie, Zelda and Maynard use the tune and change the lyrics to "The Name's Dobie Gillis" to use as Dobie's campaign song for his student council election bid.

Bing Crosby included the song in a medley on his album 101 Gang Songs (1961)

Harry Belafonte recorded a version on his 1962 album The Midnight Special. On the sleeves notes it states; 'He wrote and tried out OLD SMOKEY during his 1961 summer tour'.

Alvin and the Chipmunks covered the song for their 1962 album The Chipmunk Songbook.

In Germany, the tune of the song was used as the chorus to singer Manuela's hit single "Ich geh' noch zur Schule" in 1963. The recording, though, had nothing to do with the traditional heritage of the original song: "Ich geh' noch zur Schule" (meaning "I Still Go to School") tells the story of a teenage girl denying the tempting offers of a talent scout, claiming she wants to finish school first, but she might agree to a recording contract the following year after her final exams.

Little Eva, singer of "The Loco-Motion", recorded a version called "Old Smokey Locomotion" (1963), with lyrics describing how the residents of Old Smokey caught on to The Locomotion.

In 1964 during Beatlemania, Al Fisher & Lou Marks had "Paul George John And Ringo (All The Way to the Bank)" sung to the "Old Smoky" tune (Swan LP-514).

On the 1975 Sesame Street album, Bert & Ernie Sing-Along, Grover sings a version of the song, but changes the lyrics to something about him losing his clothes, lunch, various other belongings, and his way home, but eventually finding his way home and finding his mother with all the stuff he sang about losing.

In 1978, "On Top of Old Smokey" was released by Swedish pop group ABBA (with lead vocals by Frida) as part of a medley that also included "Pick a Bale of Cotton" and "Midnight Special". The medley featured as the B-side to the group's single "Summer Night City".

Bruce Springsteen performed the song in Portland, Oregon a few months after the 1980 eruption of Mount St. Helens as a tribute during The River Tour.

In a 1990 episode of the American television series Twin Peaks, "Big Ed" Hurley (Everett McGill) sings the song to his hospitalized wife, Nadine (Wendy Robie).

Fans of the English football side Notts County FC have sung the song during games, to the words 'I had a wheelbarrow, the wheel fell off' since 1990.

In 1991, Swedish comedy group(s) Galenskaparna och After Shave performed a variant in their "Grisen i Säcken" revue.

Alternative country band The Gourds gangstered the lyrics to "On Top of Old Smoky" in the song "I'm troubled" on their 1998 release Gogitchyershinebox.

Parodies 
The Mexican trio in the Goofy short For Whom the Bulls Toil made in 1953, attempted to sing "On Top of Old Popocatépetl". 

A hit song from in 1963, "On Top of Spaghetti" by Tom Glazer, begins with the quatrain

This version, too, seems to have entered modern folklore and is widely known to children; one source writes of the original "On Top of Old Smoky", "if you can listen to it and not think about spaghetti, sneezing and meatballs, more power to you." The Dutch version, with as first line "een bord met spaghetti" ("a plate with spaghetti") by Rijk de Gooijer came out in 1963 as well.

In his medley "Schticks Of One And Half A Dozen Of The Other" (1963), Allen Sherman sings a modified version: "On top of Old Smokey, all covered with hair/Of course I'm referring to Smokey the Bear."

Use in classical music 
In 1953, Ernő Dohnányi used the tune (and also two other traditional American folktunes) in his final composition American Rhapsody.

See also
 American folk music
 Appalachian music

Notes

References
Brown, Frank, and Newman Ivey White (1977) The Frank C. Brown Collection of NC Folklore: Vol. V: The Music of the Folk Songs. Durham:  Duke University Press.  The material on "On Top of Old Smokey" can be read online at Google Books: .
 Seeger, Pete (1961) American favorite ballads: Tunes and songs as sung by Pete Seeger. New York:  Oak Publications.
Sharp, Cecil and Maud Karpeles (1916) "Old Smokey", unpublished page of field notes.  Archives of Clare College, Cambridge; posted online by the Vaughan Williams Memorial Library:  .
Sharp, Cecil and Maud Karpeles (1917) English folk songs from the southern Appalachians : comprising 122 songs and ballads, and 323 tunes. New York : G.P. Putnam's Sons. An early sketch containing a subset of the material in Sharp and Karpeles (1932).
Sharp, Cecil and Maud Karpeles (1932) Folk songs of the Southern Appalachians. Oxford:  Oxford University Press.  "On Top of Old Smoky" is song 64A of Volume 2.

External links 
 Extensive discussion at the site "Joop's musical flowers":  

American folk songs
Burl Ives songs
Vaughn Monroe songs
The Weavers songs
Terry Gilkyson songs
Year of song unknown
1951 singles
Songwriter unknown